The Hallerbos (Dutch for Halle forest) is a forest in Belgium, covering an area of . It is mostly situated in the municipality of Halle, in Flemish Brabant and has also a little part in Walloon Brabant.

The forest is known in the region for its bluebell carpet which covers the forest floor for a few weeks each spring, attracting many visitors.

Visitors can reach there either by their own vehicle or through public transport. For public transport, you can reach Halle railway station and get a bus to the entrance of the forest.

History 

Historically, the Hallerbos was part of the Silva Carbonaria, along with other forests in the vicinity including the Sonian Forest and Meerdaal. As late as 1777, it was still connected by a woodland strip to the Sonian Forest. During World War I, most of the old trees were removed by the occupying German forces. Reforestation took place from 1930 to 1950.

Gallery

See also 

 Bluebell wood

References

Further reading 
 Hallerbos on the website of Nature and Forest by the Flemish Government in Belgium: http://www.natuurenbos.be/nl-BE/Domeinen/Vlaams-Brabant/Hallerbos.aspx
 Official website with view of the flowers and forest: http://www.hallerbos.be/en/

Forests of Belgium
Geography of Flemish Brabant
Tourist attractions in Flemish Brabant